The 2010 MFA Cup final took place on 18 December 2010 at the Germain Comarmond stadium in Mauritius. The match was contested by AS de Vacoas-Phoenix and Pointe aux Sables Mates. AS de Vacoas-Phoenix won the final 1-0.

Match

References

Mauritian Cup
Cup